is a Shingi Shingon Buddhist temple of the Buzan-ha located halfway up a mountainside in the town of Mashiko, Tochigi, Japan. Built in 737 and rebuilt in 1492, it is one of the four oldest temples in eastern Japan. It is the only temple where one can see a statue of a laughing Enma, the Judge of Hell. The temple also has a stand of shikeidake, a decorative bamboo originally from China with four-sided, rather than round, stalks that grow to 30 feet in height. Saimyō-ji has been designated an Important Cultural Property by the Government of Japan.

References

Buddhist temples in Tochigi Prefecture